Merle Dandridge (born May 31, 1975) is an American actress and singer. She is best known for performing in Broadway musicals such as Jesus Christ Superstar, Spamalot, Rent, and Once on This Island, as well as her video game roles as Alyx Vance in Half-Life 2 and Marlene in the The Last of Us franchise. She played the leading role of Grace Greenleaf in the Oprah Winfrey Network drama series, Greenleaf (2016-2020). She’s had recurring roles on television series such as Sons of Anarchy and The Night Shift and starred as Kim Hammond in the first season of HBO Max comedy-drama series, The Flight Attendant in 2020. In 2022, Dandridge began starring as Natasha Seo-Yeon Ross in the ABC action series Station 19. She reprised her role as Marlene in the 2023 television adaptation of The Last of Us.

Early life
Dandridge was born in Okinawa on May 31, 1975. Dandridge’s mother is half Japanese and half Korean, and her father is African-American. She moved back to the U.S. with her parents due to her father's job, and they lived at Beale Air Force Base in California before settling at Offutt Air Force Base in Bellevue, Nebraska, where Dandridge spent the majority of her childhood. She attended Papillion La Vista High School and participated in the play production class and theater department there. She then attended the Theatre Conservatory at Roosevelt University (currently called the Chicago College of Performing Arts).

Career
Dandridge began her career appearing in Chicago theatre productions. She has gained a wider audience as the voice of Alyx Vance in the award-winning action game Half-Life 2 and its sequels, Episode One and Episode Two, and also as Marlene in The Last of Us. In 2006, she was cast as Kala in the original Broadway production of Tarzan.  Dandridge earned a BAFTA Award for her voiceover performance in the 2015 game Everybody's Gone to the Rapture. On television, she guest starred on NCIS, 24, Criminal Minds, The Newsroom and Drop Dead Diva. In 2022, she was cast in a series regular role as Chief in the ABC drama series Station 19. Dandridge also had the recurring roles in the FX drama series, Sons of Anarchy as Rita Roosevelt, and short-lived The CW teen soap Star-Crossed in 2014. In 2015, she co-starred in the second season of NBC medical drama, The Night Shift as Gwen Gaskin.

In 2015, Dandridge was cast as the lead character in the Oprah Winfrey Network drama series, Greenleaf opposite Lynn Whitfield. She plays the role of Grace Greenleaf, Greenleaf's estranged daughter. Dandridge has received critical acclaim for her first leading screen role.

From November 9, 2017, to January 7, 2018, Dandridge starred as Papa Ge the God of Death in the Broadway musical revival of Once on This Island, at the Circle in the Square Theater. She returned to the role of Papa Ge in a limited run from June 18 to August 19, 2018. Along with cast, she received Grammy Award for Best Musical Theater Album nomination for cast recording. Also in 2018, she had a recurring role in the CBS comedy series Murphy Brown playing the role of a network boss. In 2020, Dandridge was cast in a series regular role in the eight-episode HBO Max thriller drama series The Flight Attendant. In 2021 she was cast to reprise her role as Marlene from the critically acclaimed game The Last of Us, in the HBO series of the same name.

Acting credits

Film

Television

Stage

Video games

Awards and nominations

References

External links
 Official website
 
 

1975 births
African-American actresses
American actresses of Japanese descent
American actresses of Korean descent
American film actresses
American stage actresses
American television actresses
American video game actresses
American voice actresses
American film actors of Asian descent
Living people
Roosevelt University alumni
20th-century American actresses
21st-century American actresses
21st-century African-American women
21st-century African-American people
BAFTA winners (people)
Japanese actresses of Korean descent
Japanese people of African-American descent